Jason Thorpe Robinson OBE (born 30 July 1974) is an English former dual-code international rugby league and rugby union footballer who played in the 1990s and 2000s. Playing as a wing or fullback, he won 51 rugby union international caps for England and is the first black man to captain the England team. He was part of the 2003 World Cup winning rugby union England team.

In rugby league he won 12 caps for Great Britain and seven for England. Throughout his career Robinson was noted for his speed and acceleration, side-step and ability to beat defenders.

Rugby league
Born 30 July 1974 in Leeds, West Yorkshire, Robinson began playing rugby as a child at the Hunslet Boys Club and then Hunslet Parkside before starting his rugby league career in 1991 at semi-professional side Hunslet. Despite being offered a contract by Leeds, he stuck by his club as it would have meant leaving at an inconvenient time. He was later rewarded by a contract with Wigan Warriors who went on to dominate British rugby league. His form quickly establishing him in Wigan's first team, as a teenager he was touted as a future halfback or loose forward. He was selected to play on the wing for Wigan against the visiting Brisbane Broncos in the 1992 World Club Challenge.

Robinson played in Wigan's 5–4 victory over St. Helens in the 1992 Lancashire Cup Final at Knowsley Road, St. Helens on Sunday 18 October 1992.

He played and scored a try in Wigan's 15–8 victory over Bradford Northern in the 1992–93 Regal Trophy Final during the 1992–93 season at Elland Road, Leeds on Saturday 23 January 1993, played in the 2–33 defeat by Castleford in the 1993–94 Regal Trophy Final during the 1993–94 season at Headingley Rugby Stadium, Leeds on Saturday 22 January 1994, played in the 40–10 victory over Warrington in the 1994–95 Regal Trophy Final during the 1994–95 season at Alfred McAlpine Stadium, Huddersfield on Saturday28 January 1995, and played in the 25–16 victory over St. Helens in the 1995–96 Regal Trophy Final during the 1995–96 season at Alfred McAlpine Stadium, Huddersfield on Saturday 13 January 1996.

In 1993 Robinson played in his first Challenge Cup Final, with Wigan defeating Widnes. Later that year at age 19 Robinson was first selected to represent Great Britain on the wing against New Zealand.

After the 1993–94 Rugby Football League season Robinson travelled with defending champions Wigan to Brisbane, playing on the wing in their 1994 World Club Challenge victory over Australian premiers, the Brisbane Broncos.

It was reported in 1995 that Robinson was offered a 4-year deal worth a record £1.25 million by the Australian Rugby League to play for the South Sydney Rabbitohs at the end of 1997's Super League II. He recovered from a foot injury to play in Wigan's 30–10 Challenge Cup Final victory over Leeds, scoring two tries and earning himself the Lance Todd Trophy as man-of-the-match.

Robinson played for England in the 1995 World Cup Final on the wing but Australia won the match and retained the Cup.

In May 1996, Robinson played for Wigan in a special two-game, cross code challenge series against Bath, then the leading club side in English rugby union. Robinson scored twice in the first game, an 82-6 victory for Wigan under league rules, as well as playing in the union game, which ended 44-19 to Bath. Following the cross-code challenge series, a number of Wigan's players, including Robinson, elected to take advantage of the fact that rugby union had turned professional, and ended its ban on players that had played rugby league, by signing short-term contracts to play union during the Super League off-season. Robinson joined Bath and played 14 games for the side between September 1996 and January 1997. At the end of the first Super League season, Robinson was named on the wing in the 1996 Super League Dream Team.

In the midst of the Super League war, Robinson played a one-off international for a 'Rest of the World' team in their 28–8 loss against the Australian Rugby League's Kangaroos in mid-1997. With his contracted move to Sydney set to take place at the conclusion of the 1997's Super League II, Robinson had had a change of heart and Wigan were able to negotiate his release from the ARL's contract so he could continue playing for his club. He then scored a try for Great Britain in each of the three matches against Australia in the post-season Super League Test series.

In 1998 Robinson scored Wigan's only try in Super League's first ever Grand Final, which the Cherry & Whites won. As a result, he was awarded the Harry Sunderland Trophy as man-of-the-match. He was also named on the wing in the 1998 season's Super League Dream Team, and again in 1999 and 2000.

Robinson played at fullback in the Wigan Warriors' defeat by St. Helens in the 2000 Super League Grand Final. Days after the match, it was announced that he had signed for the Zurich Premiership's Sale Sharks rugby union side, with Robinson citing the lack of anything left to prove in rugby league and the desire to represent England and Great Britain in the 15-man code.

Rugby union
He made his début for Sale Sharks against Coventry in November 2000. In the 2005/6 season he became the first person to have won both the Guinness Premiership, and the Super League trophies.

England
Robinson made his England début as a substitute against Italy in February 2001, having played in the A match against Wales at Wrexham a fortnight earlier. In doing so he was only the second man ever to play rugby union for England after having first played Rugby League for Great Britain (the first having been Barrie-Jon Mather in 1999).

He scored 30 tries in 56 international matches, including a try in the 2003 World Cup Final against Australia. He played in all seven of England's World Cup games in 2003.

After Lawrence Dallaglio's international retirement in 2005, Jonny Wilkinson was initially appointed captain. However, Wilkinson was injured for the 2005 autumn internationals and Robinson was appointed captain. He was the 118th captain of England, the first mixed-race player and the first former professional rugby league footballer to captain England. In his first appearance as captain, he scored a hat-trick of tries in a 70–0 rout of Canada.

In the 2004 Six Nations, he scored three tries playing as a centre in the opening match against Italy and was named Man of the Match. Robinson chose to opt out of the 2004 summer tour to recover.

British & Irish Lions
Robinson was selected by the British & Irish Lions for their 2001 tour of Australia, and was one of the outstanding players in the side that won the first Test in Brisbane 29–13. In that game he sidestepped past Australian fullback Chris Latham. He went on to score another try in the last Test.

Robinson was again called up to the Lions' 2005 tour of New Zealand. He was excused from travelling with the bulk of the touring party to spend time with his wife, who was expecting the couple's fourth child in August. Throughout his career, he normally brought his wife and children along when he went on a tour, but her pregnancy made this impossible for the 2005 tour. He joined the team on 7 June, well in advance of the first New Zealand test on 25 June.

International retirement

On 24 September 2005, Robinson announced his retirement from international rugby union, stating that he wished to spend more time with his family. In the 2005–2006 season, Robinson led his club Sale Sharks to their first ever Premiership title.

Return
Robinson returned to the England set-up for the 2007 Six Nations tournament, following the decision of new head coach Brian Ashton to recall him to provide the leadership and winning quality the team had lacked in the past year, ending a 15-month absence from the international scene. He scored two tries on his return in England's opening victory over Scotland. He also scored another try against the Italians the following week.

On 2 April 2007, Robinson announced he would retire from playing club rugby at the end of the 2006/07 season. He also announced he would participate, if required, in England's summer friendlies and the 2007 Rugby World Cup, before retiring completely from the sport. His last game for Sale Sharks came at home to Bath on Friday 13 April. Robinson said, "I have thoroughly enjoyed my time at Sale Sharks but the time has come to move on to other things. I want my last game for Sale Sharks to be a home game (v Bath) and want to be able to say a big thank you to the supporters of this great club."

On 13 April 2007, Robinson ended his club career with a match-winning try 6 seconds from time as Sale edged past Bath in the Guinness Premiership. In the last play of the game, he received the ball 30 metres out and could not be stopped. He was then given the opportunity to convert the try, only to miss by a matter of inches past the left post.

On 14 September 2007, Robinson left the field to a standing ovation during England's defeat by South Africa, with a hamstring injury. This kept him out of England's remaining two group games, but he resumed full training in time to be available to play in the knock-out stages. In the quarter-final against Australia, Robinson returned to the side as full back and played his part in a tense 12–10 victory over the Wallabies. In the semi-final victory over France, his 50th cap, he was given the honour of leading out the England team. Robinson's last game for England came in the 2007 World Cup Final defeat by South Africa, when he was forced to leave the field during the second half, due to an injury. He was one of only four players to have started both the 2003 and 2007 Finals, the other three being Jonny Wilkinson, Ben Kay, and Phil Vickery.

Robinson was selected to play for the Barbarians at Twickenham on 1 December 2007, showing many of his trademark runs and received a standing ovation as he left the field for the last time in the 68th minute of the match.

Fylde

On 26 July 2010, Robinson came out of retirement at the age of 35 to play for National League 2 North side; Fylde. He announced his final retirement on 7 July 2011.

International tries

England

British & Irish Lions

Coaching career 
On 5 March 2008, the RFL announced that Robinson would be returning to rugby league in a coaching capacity at grass roots level from under 8s to open age, as a dual code ambassador for the sport in association with Gillette.

On 25 February 2009 it was announced that Robinson would be re-joining Sale Sharks as the new head coach from the 2009–10 season.

Awards
Already a Member of the Order of the British Empire (MBE), he was appointed Officer of the Order of the British Empire (OBE) in the 2008 New Year Honours.

In March 2017, Robinson was awarded the Lifetime Achievement Award at the Lycamobile British Ethnic Diversity Sports Awards (BEDSAs) held at the London Hilton on Park Lane.

Personal life
He is of Scottish and Jamaican descent. His father William Thorpe, a Jamaican living in Leeds, left his mother before Robinson's birth. Robinson and his two older brothers Bernard and George were raised by his mother and a step father. In 2003, he was reunited with his natural father again through his brother and sister. Robinson is nicknamed 'Billy Whizz' after a character in the British comic The Beano, who is an extremely fast runner.

In 2012, his eldest son Lewis Tierney, who plays as a full back, signed a two-year deal with Wigan Warriors at age 18. Tierney has declared himself for Scotland. Robinson has five other children including Patrick, a professional cyclist.

After the 2003 Rugby World Cup, Robinson wrote an autobiography entitled Finding My Feet: My Autobiography published by Coronet Books. In it, he wrote about how he overcame issues from his childhood and bouts of drinking when he found success as a rugby league star. In 2005, a biography, The Real Jason Robinson, written with Robinson's full co-operation by Dave Swanton, was published by Empire Publications.

See also
 List of top English points scorers and try scorers

References

External links

Statistics (RL) at wigan.rlfans.com
(archived by web.archive.org) Profile (RU) at england-rugby.com
 Jason Robinson photo 1 by sportingheroes.net
 Jason Robinson photo 2 by sportingheroes.net
(archived by web.archive.org) Jason Robinson feature at bbc.co.uk

1974 births
Living people
Barbarian F.C. players
Bath Rugby players
Black British sportsmen
British & Irish Lions rugby union players from England
Dual-code rugby internationals
England international rugby union players
England national rugby league team players
English people of Jamaican descent
English people of Scottish descent
English rugby league coaches
English rugby league players
English rugby union coaches
English rugby union players
Great Britain national rugby league team players
Hunslet R.L.F.C. players
Lance Todd Trophy winners
Officers of the Order of the British Empire
People from Belle Isle, Leeds
Rugby league fullbacks
Rugby league players from Leeds
Rugby league wingers
Rugby union fullbacks
Rugby union players from Leeds
Rugby union wings
Sale Sharks players
Wigan Warriors players